Tetratheca similis is a species of plant in the quandong family that is endemic to Australia.

Description
The species grows as a spreading shrub to 30 cm in height. The pink flowers appear from August to September.

Distribution and habitat
The range of the species lies in the Avon Wheatbelt and Jarrah Forest IBRA bioregions of south-west Western Australia. The plants grow in sandy clay soils with lateritic boulders.

References

similis
Eudicots of Western Australia
Oxalidales of Australia
Taxa named by Joy Thompson
Plants described in 1976